The N-152 is a Spanish national road in Catalonia, Spain, which originally linked Barcelona with the French border at Puigcerda/Bourg-Madame, in the eastern Pyrenees.

The Barcelona-Ripoll section was recently transferred to the Generalitat de Catalunya (government of Catalonia), and therefore its name changed to C-17. 

The Ripoll-Puigcerdà section (still named N-152) passes through La Molina and Ribes de Freser, and over the Collada de Tosas mountain pass.

Roads in Catalonia
National roads in Spain